Carlos Manuel de Céspedes Airport  is a regional airport serving the city of Bayamo in the Granma Province of Cuba. It is named for Carlos Manuel de Céspedes.

References

External links

Airports in Cuba
Buildings and structures in Granma Province